Bratchers Crossroads is an unincorporated community in Warren County, in the U.S. state of Tennessee.

History
The community was likely named for Benjamin Bratcher, an early settler.

References

Unincorporated communities in Warren County, Tennessee
Unincorporated communities in Tennessee